Alodía Almira Arraiza Gosiengfiao-Quimbo (born March 9, 1988) is a Filipina cosplayer, model, TV presenter, singer, vlogger, actress and co-founder of Tier One Entertainment. She is also known as Senpai Alodia of the Philippines. As a celebrity endorser, she is one of the ambassadors and VJ for Animax Asia known as the "Ani-mates" and co-host of ABS-CBN's prank show Laugh Out Loud. She has been featured in various magazines, newspapers and TV shows locally and abroad. She appeared on the Filipino FHM 100 Sexiest Women poll, ranking No. 1 in 2009, No. 2 in 2010 and No. 3 in 2012; she posed as the cover girl for that magazine on its July 2013 issue. She was named by DOS Magazine as one of the Most Influential Women in the Philippines.

Cosplaying 

Alodía became involved in cosplay after contacting other anime and video game enthusiasts in an internet fan forum called Animé Club. Encouraged by her friends from the forum, she started cosplaying in 2003 at the age of 15, joining various competitions in Metro Manila. Her first cosplayed character was a Priestess from Ragnarok Online at Ragnalaunch in Glorietta. She began to attract attention when she won 3rd place in the 2003 C3 Convention as Gun Mage Rikku of Final Fantasy X-2. This led to her and her younger sister Ashley Gosiengfiao being featured on the cover of Issue 14 of Culture Crash Magazine, a manga magazine in the Philippines. Since then, she cosplayed a series of characters from over 40 anime, movie and video game titles including: Witchblade, G.I. Joe, K-On!, Paradise Kiss, Evangelion and Final Fantasy X-2. As a multi-awarded cosplayer, she is now being invited to appear at conventions or to judge competitions locally and abroad. She started judging at the age of 18.

International appearances 
Due to her constant contribution to the cosplay community in the Philippines, Alodía has been invited into various international cosplay conventions and events as a participant, performer, judge or simply to attend as a guest. In November 2009 at Suntec Convention Hall in Singapore, Alodía, together with her younger sister Ashley, represented the Philippines as one of the finalist for the Anime Festival Asia Regional Cosplay Championship. Alodía and Ashley cosplayed as Masane Amaha and Shiori Tsuzuki from the Witchblade anime.

On July 3, 2010, Singapore, Alodía and Ashley Gosiengfiao were invited by the Mascot Parade supported by the Singapore Government to judge the cosplay competition. They both cosplayed characters from the romantic anime series Paradise Kiss. In addition to judging the cosplay competition, Alodía and Ashley also performed two songs on stage: "Lonely in Gorgeous" from Paradise Kiss and "Real Emotion" from the hit Japanese roleplaying game Final Fantasy X-2. Animax also held "meet and greet" sessions with Alodía in Camp Pong for Singaporean anime and cosplay enthusiasts.

On July 21–24, 2010, Alodía attended the annual San Diego Comic-Con for a cosplay gathering at Kotobukiya booth. She landed a big role in the San Diego Comic-Con documentary directed by Morgan Spurlock and produced by Legendary Pictures. The documentary team followed 5 different people from around the world to document what they did at the San Diego Comic Convention in the United States – line up includes an artist, comic book enthusiast, cosplayer, etc. Part of the team was Stan Lee, the father of Marvel Comics. This led to a meeting with Legendary Pictures CEO/founder Thomas Tull and vice president Alex Garcia, regarding their upcoming film, Warcraft. After this meeting, Gosiengfiao was featured in a very popular US-based website Kotaku. Blizzard Entertainment, maker of Warcraft, got in touch with Alodía regarding business and an endorsement deal for their new game, Star Craft 2. She also won the "Hall Costume Award" as an award given by the Costume Designers Guild to convention members who wear exceptional get-ups inside the venue.

On October 31, 2010, Alodía together with Animax and Hong Kong Tourism Board held an event "Hong Kong Halloween Treats Party". Hong Kong Halloween Treats Party is the culmination of a one-and-a-half-month-long campaign by Hong Kong Tourism Board and Animax to promote Hong Kong across South-East Asia as the dream Halloween destination. Cosplayers from all over Asia gathered to celebrate the event.

On November 13, 2010, Alodía was back again in Singapore for the Anime Festival Asia 2010 in Suntec Convention Hall, this time she was invited as a Celebrity Judge for the AFA Regional Cosplay Championship. The same event Alodía and Ashley attended as a finalist and representative of the Philippines way back 2009. Gosiengfiao graced the event along with the Japanese celebrity guests namely Ichirou Mizuki, May'n, SCANDAL, JAM Project, Angela, Kana Hanazawa, Milky Holmes and the Cosplayers Kaname and Aira.

On November 27, 2010, Gosiengfiao's "Rei Ayanami" Grimrock version cosplay made its first appearance at the 2010 Supanova Pop Culture Expo in Brisbane, Australia, she was invited to guest judge the Madman National Cosplay Championship as part of the Supanova Cosplay Festival.

Endorsements, media and press 
Her achievements in the cosplay community led her way to be recognized by the mainstream media and various companies in the Philippines. Currently she is endorsing a whitening skin care product; a health food and beverage product; a Japanese sushi bar; a toy collector and figurine distributor in the Philippines; a large video game company based in Japan; a clothing line; and Japanese snack. She also became one of the brand ambassador of a Philippine telecommunication company, and in 2012 became a brand ambassador for Canon.

Past endorsements include many video game companies such as Level-Up Games, E-Games, Kelphil's Shade and SEGA's Love and Berry. She was part of the Official Muse Guild for the massively multiplayer online role-playing game (MMORPG) Mu Online. She was also a game moderator for another MMORPG called Khan Online. Gosiengfiao was chosen as the Rose-It Girl during the Level Up Games' ROSE Online event and was given the title of "Community Manager" and a one-year contract with Level Up Games. As the official model and endorser of IPVG-EGames Zhu Xian Online game in 2009, Gosiengfiao, an avid gamer, hold her first Fans Day during the Domination 3 Event in April 2009.

Gosiengfiao is the Animax's first ever Levi's Kawaii girl winner in the last episode of Mad Mad Fun, which was announced on air on October 27, 2007. In 2010, Alodia together with Ashley Gosiengfiao and model Steph Henares was chosen by Animax to be their Ambassador and VJ, known as the Ani-Mates. It was the first time Animax had chosen a cosplayer as one of its VJs. Gosiengfiao's cosplay and hosting stints in various events and Animax paved the way for her first project in ABS-CBN. She is now seen as a Host in ABS-CBN's prank show titled "L.O.L" (Laugh Out Loud) with Luis Manzano every Saturday night.

She has been featured in several magazines such as Candy Magazine, Meg Magazine, Preview Magazine, GAME! Magazine, Digital Photographers Philippines Magazine and newspapers like Philippine Daily Inquirer, Manila Bulletin and Manila Times. She was also invited to appear as guest on TV shows like MogTV, QTV 11 now GMA News TV, Front Act, Matanglawin, Mel and Joey and Ang Pinaka. Other than local media, Gosiengfiao has also been featured in newspapers and magazines in different countries such as Japan, Singapore and United States. She was also part of the book called OTACOOL: Worldwide Otaku Rooms and OTACOOL2: Worldwide Cosplayers by Danny Choo.

She was also featured on a TV show in Tokyo Culture: Japan, featuring her costumes, artworks, comic books and figure collections which was also shown in Animax. Additionally, she was featured in Channel News Asia: Primetime Morning and Straits Times Razor TV in Singapore.

Gosiengfiao ranked No. 76 in the Philippine FHM 100 Sexiest Women poll for 2010 and ranked No. 87 in 2009. She was named by UNO Magazine as one of the Most Influential Women in the Philippines.

On 2016, Gosiengfiao appeared as one of the zombies along with her sister, Ashley Gosiengfiao, in Resident Evil: The Final Chapter, which is a final installment of Resident Evil film series, which was released in the Philippines in the following year.

Gaming career 
As she continued her rise to international recognition in cosplay, Gosiengfiao branched out to her lifelong passion of gaming. In 2014, she started streaming video games on Twitch and quickly became a Twitch Partner by streaming various games such as Dota 2 and League of Legends. Through her streaming endeavors she was able to secure brand deals with various gaming sponsors such as Acer Predator, Sony PlayStation Asia and many others. On April 21, 2017, Gosiengfiao and veteran esports shout caster Tryke Gutierrez founded Tier One Entertainment, the Philippines' first gaming and esports agency, which also made its reach in some parts of Southeast Asia. On March 14, 2018, she announced her exclusive partnership with Facebook Gaming and transitioned her video game streams and content to her official Facebook Page. She was one of the first Facebook Gaming partners from Asia and paved the way for additional Asian streamers to join the platform including Suzzysaur, Yasumeow Gaming, Thinnd, Freya Fox and Amie Lynn.

On June 13, 2018, Gosiengfiao teamed up with Sony PlayStation to promote Days Gone and Spiderman at E3 2018. During E3 2018, she and fellow Facebook Gaming partners Stonemountain64 and other creators participated in the first Facebook Gaming Creator meet and greets.

On December 4, 2018, Gosiengfiao went viral on Italian news as her Mobile Legends gaming stream interrupted Italian Prime Minister Matteo Salvini's Facebook stream. It is unclear how the interruption happened, but it resulted in over 12,000 of Salvini's viewers video chained to her gaming stream.

On February 21, 2020, Lyceum of The Philippines University announced its partnership with Gosiengfiao to develop Esports curriculum with Gosiengfiao's company, Tier One Entertainment.

Personal life 
Alodia Gosiengfiao lives in Quezon City, Philippines, and is fond of art, fashion, gadgets, video games, photography, collecting toys and figures such as BJDs, and plays the piano. Her mother found her name in a name book; 'Alodia' means "love" and 'Almira' means "princess". She is of Filipino and Chinese descent; her father, Ed Gosiengfiao, a businessman and mechanical engineer, is Chinese Filipino while her mother, Mariglor Arraiza, is a former customer service advisor. She has a younger sister, Ashley Gosiengfiao, who is also a cosplayer. She is the niece of former Filipino movie director Joey Gosiengfiao.

Gosiengfiao attended Assumption College (Makati) from pre-school to grade 2, Miriam College from grade 3 to her fourth year of high school, and Ateneo de Manila University, where she graduated in 2009 with a BFA degree in Information Design. As a high school student, she was a member of the Miriam College High School pep squad. She also worked on art commissions for international clients, illustrating both digital and traditional artwork.

On February 14, 2018, Gosiengfiao and YouTube vlogger Wil Dasovich revealed that they were in a relationship. On November 14, 2021, Gosiengfiao confirmed through her Facebook page that she and Dasovich have broken up. In early 2022, Gosiengfiao is in relationship with the Calabria Company Ltd. President and General Manager, Christopher Quimbo. On July 23, 2022, Gosiengfiao and Quimbo announced their engagement through their social medias. The couple married on February 14, 2023, the ceremony was attended by the couple's family and close friends in the industry. Her sister, Ashley served as her maid of honor.

On Valentine's Day of 2021, she and her sister Ashley Gosiengfiao launched their podcast named The Raid with Alodia and Ashley on Spotify as it tackles on gaming, anime, and pop culture.

Filmography

Television

Film

Discography 
"アジアの変身" – Super Dolls — (2013)
"ヒロイン症候群" – Super Dolls — (2013)
"かわいいガール" (featuring Tenchim & Dempagumi.inc) — (2013)
’Tear It Off - Mobile Legends Bang Bang (2022)

Awards and recognition

FHM 100 Sexiest Women

Other recognitions

References

External links 

Ateneo de Manila University alumni
Cosplayers
Filipino television directors
Star Magic
Filipino film actresses
People from Quezon City
Filipino people of Basque descent
Filipino people of Chinese descent
Filipino people of Spanish descent
Living people
Filipino actors of Chinese descent
Filipino songwriters
Filipino television personalities
Filipina gravure idols
21st-century Filipino women singers
YouTubers
Women television directors
1988 births